Skippy is an American brand of peanut butter spread manufactured in the United States and China. First sold in 1932, Skippy is currently manufactured by Hormel Foods, which bought the brand from Unilever in 2013. It is the best-selling brand of peanut butter in China and second only to the J.M. Smucker Company's Jif brand worldwide.

History 
Percy Crosby, creator of the popular "Skippy" comic strip (1923–1945), which had been adapted into the 1929 novel Skippy, the daytime children's radio serial Skippy (1932–1935), and the Oscar-winning 1931 film Skippy, had trademarked the name "Skippy" in 1925. When, in 1932, the Alameda, California food packer Joseph L. Rosefield began to sell its newly developed hydrogenated peanut butter, which it labeled "Skippy" without permission, Crosby successfully had the trademark invalidated in 1934. Rosefield persisted using the name and after Crosby was committed to an asylum and after the passage in 1946 of the Lanham Act, Rosefield was granted rights to the trademark.

In 1955, Rosefield sold the brand to Best Foods. Its successor companies, most recently Unilever and Hormel, claim rights to the trademark over the objection of Crosby's heirs, and much litigation has occurred on this point over the decades, some of which has continued into the 2000s.

Skippy is sold in many different sizes, including a  jar, known as the "Family Jar".

Production
Skippy has factories in Little Rock, Arkansas, and Shandong Province, China.   About 750,000 pounds of peanuts are brought daily to the Skippy Peanut Butter plant in Little Rock, Arkansas, resulting in over 3.5 million pounds of peanut butter produced each week. 

There are 14 different varieties of Skippy Peanut Butter Spread.                                                                    

 Skippy Creamy Peanut Butter 
 Skippy Super Chunk Peanut Butter 
 Skippy Roasted Honey Nut Creamy Peanut Butter 
 Skippy Reduced Fat Creamy Peanut Butter 
 Skippy Reduced Fat Super Chunk Peanut Butter 
 Skippy Peanut Butter Blended with Plant Protein Creamy
 Skippy Peanut Butter Blended with Plant Protein Chunky
 Skippy Creamy Peanut Butter Spread No Sugar Added
 Skippy Chunky Peanut Butter Spread No Sugar Added
 Skippy Natural Creamy Peanut Butter Spread
 Skippy Natural Creamy Peanut Butter Spread with Honey
 Skippy Natural Super Chunk Peanut Butter Spread
 Skippy Natural Super Chunk Peanut Butter Spread with Honey
 Skippy Natural Creamy 1/3 Less Sodium & Sugar Peanut Butter Spread

Skippy is also available in a 6 oz. squeeze pack in Creamy or Natural Peanut Butter Spread and 1.15 oz. individual squeeze 8 packs in Creamy or Natural Peanut Butter Spread. 

In 2018, Skippy added Skippy P.B. Fruit Bites to their Skippy P.B. Bites that were already available in Double Peanut Butter, Pretzel and Graham Cracker. 

On September 12, 2018, Skippy announced a new line of Skippy P.B. & Jelly Minis in Peanut Butter & Grape Jelly, Natural Peanut Butter & Grape Jelly and Peanut Butter & Strawberry Jelly.

Nutrition 
Skippy Peanut Butter is a cholesterol-free and gluten-free food.  All varieties of Skippy Peanut Butter are also kosher except the Skippy P.B. bites.

As of November 2022, Skippy continues to contain hydrogenated oils (hydrogenated palm oil) in the UK.

References

External links 
 
 Skippy Peanut Butter Commercial (1958) from Youtube.com (Commercial Describing Skippy History)

Peanut butter brands
Products introduced in 1932
Hormel Foods brands
Former Unilever brands